The Massachusetts Maritime Buccaneers (also called the Mass Maritime Buccaneers) are composed of 15 varsity teams (7 men's 7 women's 1 co-ed) representing the Massachusetts Maritime Academy in intercollegiate athletics. All teams compete at the NCAA Division III level and all teams compete in the Massachusetts State Collegiate Athletic Conference (MASCAC), except for men's lacrosse, which plays in the Little East Conference (LEC), and sailing, which competes in the New England Intercollegiate Sailing Association (NEISA).

Background 
The varsity sports that the Massachusetts Maritime Buccaneers currently offers include baseball, men's and women's crew, men's and women's cross country, football, men's and women's lacrosse, co-ed sailing, men's and women's soccer, softball, men's and women's track & field, and volleyball.

Championships 

 1977 Men's Lacrosse: Won the Colonial League Championship.
 1977 Football: Won the New England Football Conference (NEFC (now Commonwealth Coast Football)) championship, a school first, finishing the season 8–1.
 1978 Men's Lacrosse: Won the Colonial League title for the second season in a row.
 1983 Football: Won the NEFC, second time in seven years, finishing the season 8–2.
 2001 Sailing: Team won the Intercollegiate Sailing National Championship, the Kennedy Cup, hosted annually in the fall by the United States Naval Academy.
 2005 Men's Cross Country: The Buccaneers earned the school's first Massachusetts State College Athletic Conference (MASCAC) conference championship in over 20 years.
 2015 Baseball: Won MASCAC regular season co-championship
 2018 Baseball: Won MASCAC regular season co-championship

Sports sponsored

NCAA Division III sports

Sports sponsorship timeline

References

External links